Ediacara Hills  are a range of low hills in the northern part of the Flinders Ranges of South Australia, around  north of the state capital of Adelaide. The hills are known for being the location of significant fossils, and have given their name to the geological period known as the Ediacaran.

Description
The area has many old copper and silver  mines from mining activity during the late 19th century. The hills also contain fossils of early multicellular life forms, the Ediacaran biota (lagerstätte), and have given their name to the Ediacaran.

The hills are located within the locality of Ediacara, named primarily after the range itself.

IUGS geological heritage site
In respect of 'the locality where well preserved Precambrian fossils of multicellular life were first found globally' the International Union of Geological Sciences (IUGS)' included the 'Ediacaran fossils in the Ediacara Hills, Flinders Ranges' in its assemblage of 100 'geological heritage sites' around the world in a listing published in October 2022. The organisation defines an IUGS Geological Heritage Site as 'a key place with geological elements and/or processes of international scientific relevance, used as a reference, and/or with a substantial contribution to the development of geological sciences through history.'

Word origin 
The name "Ediacara" has a disputed origin from one of the Aboriginal languages near the Flinders Range area. It is first known to have been used during the middle of the 19th century. Earlier Australian sources suggested that the "name "Ediacara" or "Idiyakra" may be derived from an Indigenous term associating it with a place near water".

Another theory suggests that the term may be a mispronunciation of the two words "Yata Takarra", meaning hard or stony ground ("in reference to the flat Ediacara plateau of dolomite that forms the centre of the Ediacara syncline"). Supporting this latter contention, it has been argued that the word "has nothing in it that corresponds to any word for water in any of the local languages" and that local tradition "has it that the name meant 'granite plain', but, since there appears to be no igneous rock in the area, this could well refer to the hardness of the ground, rather than to its geological composition".

However, there are a number of complications in trying to establish the origins of place names supposedly relating to Aboriginal words, and there is no definitive answer for Ediacara.

See also 

Ediacara, South Australia, a locality
 List of fossil sites (with link directory)
Nilpena Ediacara National Park

Footnotes

References

External links 
 University of California page on the Ediacara Hills
 EDIACARA RANGE entry in "Gazeteer of Australia". Commonwealth of Australia. Geoscience Australia

 
First 100 IUGS Geological Heritage Sites
Flinders Ranges
Mountain ranges of South Australia
Precambrian Oceania
Proterozoic paleontological sites of Australia
Paleontology in South Australia
Australian National Heritage List
Far North (South Australia)